Vaiala is a village on the island of Upolu in Samoa. It is situated on the central north coast of the island, to the east of the capital Apia. The village is in the political district of Tuamasaga. 

The population is 972 (2016 Census).

References

Populated places in Tuamasaga